Governor's Harbour is a principal settlement and administrative centre in Eleuthera in The Bahamas. It corresponds roughly to the centre of the former district of Central Eleuthera. Established by William Sayle and the Eleutherian Adventurers in 1648, it lays claim to being the beginning of the post-Lucayan Bahamas.

The settlement is served by Governor's Harbour Airport.

References

Former districts of the Bahamas